is a Japanese former professional cyclist, who rode professionally between 2011 and 2019 for the ,  and  teams. His first victory in a road race as a professional was in the 2013 Tour de Okinawa, which he won after the first-place finisher was demoted due to rule violations. In October 2015, he won the ninth stage of the Tour de Singkarak. He became the Japanese road race champion in June 2016. In May 2019, he was named in the startlist for the 2019 Giro d'Italia.

Major results

2012
 10th Overall Tour de Kumano
2013
 1st Tour de Okinawa
2014
 9th Overall Tour de Singkarak
2015
 6th Tour de Okinawa
 7th Overall Tour de Kumano
 10th Overall Tour de Singkarak
1st Stage 9
2016
 1st  Road race, National Road Championships
2017
 1st Mountains classification Tour of Japan
 10th Overall Tour de Korea

Grand Tour general classification results timeline

References

External links

 
 

1988 births
Living people
Japanese male cyclists